Melanophora roralis is a species of woodlouse fly in the family Rhinophoridae.

Description

Distribution
It was introduced to North America from Europe and can be found from Southern Ontario to Chile and Argentina.

Ecology
Species fly from mid-May to October and inhabit old forests and damp areas near the shore. The females of this species have a distinctive white spots at the tips of their wings and lay from 189 to 238 eggs in 6.5 to 7.5 hours. It takes up to 21 days for the species' to pupate. It is a parasite of Porcellio scaber.

References

Rhinophoridae
Flies described in 1758
Taxa named by Carl Linnaeus
Diptera of North America
Diptera of South America
Diptera of Europe